Abu Sa'id 'Ubayd Allah ibn Bakhtishu (980–1060), also spelled Bukhtishu, Bukhtyashu, and Bakhtshooa in many texts, was an 11th-century Syriac physician, descendant of Bakhtshooa Gondishapoori. He spoke the Syriac language.

He was the last representative of the Bukhtyashu family of Nestorian Christian physicians, who emigrated from Jundishapur to Baghdad in 765. His main works are the Reminder of the Homestayer, dealing with the philosophical terms used in medicine, and a treatise on lovesickness.

Notes

References 
 
 C. Brocklmann: Encyclopaedia of Islam (t. 1, 601, 1911).

See also 
 List of Iranian scientists
 The Bukhtishu family.
 Bukhtishu, Gabriel ibn. 
 Yuhanna ibn Bukhtishu

980 births
1060 deaths
Iranian Assyrian people
10th-century Iranian physicians
Physicians of the medieval Islamic world
11th-century Iranian physicians
Members of the Assyrian Church of the East
Iranian Christians
People from Baghdad
Syriac–Arabic translators